Nickelodeon is a children's and teenagers' television channel available on many pay-TV networks across Asia.

Current programming

Animated
Nickelodeon Originals

Acquired programming
 ALVINNN!!! and the Chipmunks
 Best and Bester
 Dorg Van Dango
 Lego City Adventures
 Ollie's Pack
 Rainbow Butterfly Unicorn Kitty
 The Smurfs
 The Twisted Timeline of Sammy and Raj
 Winx Club

Live-Action
Nickelodeon Originals
The Barbarian and the Troll
Danger Force (hiatus)

Nick Jr.
Animated

Nick Jr. Originals
Baby Shark's Big Show!
Rusty Rivets
Wallykazam!

Acquired programming
Abby Hatcher
Corn & Peg
PAW Patrol

Live Action

Nick Jr. Originals
Blue's Clues & You!

Former programming

Animated

Live-Action

Nick Jr. shows

Programming blocks

Current programming blocks

Nick Jr.
Nick Jr. is a programming block broadcast on Nickelodeon everyday from 9:30am to 10:40am, airing preschool programs.

Former programming blocks

Hapon Hangout
Hapon Hangout was a former block that debuted in February 2013 which aired mostly cartoons and live-action. It ended in December 2017.

Flick Picks
Flick Picks was a programming former block that airs movies.

Weekend Express
Weekend Express was a programming block that runs every weekends at noon. The block airs programs according to a weekly theme. It ended on 26 June 2011.

Lunch Toons
Lunch Toons was a limited Nicktoons-based block which airs one random Nicktoon which is repeated when airing various episodes of the show related to food.

Nickel Aliens
Nickel Aliens was a programming block that debuted in November 2014. It featured shows such as Monsters vs. Aliens, Robot and Monster, Kid vs. Kat, Teenage Mutant Ninja Turtles, Rabbids Invasion, Planet Sheen, Rocket Monkeys and Winx Club.

HAHATHON
HAHATHON was a programming block that debuted in June 2015. It featured shows such as Winx Club, Oggy and the Cockroaches, Kung Fu Panda: Legends of Awesomeness, SpongeBob SquarePants and Lalaloopsy.

WAPAK! Thursdays
Wapak Thursdays was a programming block broadcast on Nickelodeon that premieres every Thursday from 6:00 PM to 9:00 PM. It ended on 16 July since LEGO Jurassic World: Legend of Isla Nublar premiered on 20 July which re-run on weekdays at 6:30 PM.

TakoTown
TakoTown was a programing block that airs Halloween themed episodes and specials of Nickelodeon TV shows every October.

Nickelodeon Heroes
Nickelodeon Heroes was a programming block on Nickelodeon that premieres every weekdays at 4:30 PM. It airs shows such as SpongeBob SquarePants, The Loud House, Kung Fu Panda: Legends of Awesomeness, ALVINNN! and the Chipmunks and The Fairly OddParents. It ended at 30 August.

Listen Out Loud
Listen Out Loud was a programming block that airs The Loud House episodes.

TeenNick
TeenNick was a former block that aired live-action shows.

G-Time
G-Time was a programming block broadcast on Nickelodeon on weekdays from 4:00pm to 6:00pm. It debuted in November 2018 and ended in January 2019.

Animal Carnival
Animal Carnival was a programming block on Nickelodeon that debuted in April 2021. It aired on weekdays from 4-6PM. It aired shows like Deer Squad, SpongeBob SquarePants, ALVINNN! and the Chipmunks, It's Pony and 44 Cats.

Summer Happiness Lab
Summer Happiness Lab was a programming block on Nickelodeon that debuted in July 2021. It aired on weekdays from 4-6PM.

See also
Nickelodeon (Asia)
Nickelodeon (Philippines)

Notes

References

Lists of television series by network
Nickelodeon-related lists